A special effect is an illusion or visual trick used in the film, television, theatre, video game, and simulator industries.

Special Effect(s) may also refer to:

Tokusatsu, Japanese film genre that literally means "special effects."
Special Effects (album), an album by Tech N9ne
Special Effects (film), a 1984 film by Larry Cohen
Special Effects, a 1972 film from Hollis Frampton's Hapax Legomena cycle
Special Effects: Anything Can Happen, a 1996 documentary film
SpecialEffect, a UK-based charity